The War of the Roses is a 1989 American satirical black comedy film based upon the 1981 novel of the same name by Warren Adler. The film follows a wealthy couple with a seemingly perfect marriage. When their marriage begins to fall apart, material possessions become the center of an outrageous and bitter divorce battle.

The film co-stars Michael Douglas, Kathleen Turner, and Danny DeVito. The three actors had previously worked together in Romancing the Stone and its sequel The Jewel of the Nile. DeVito directed the film, which also had producer James L. Brooks and actor Dan Castellaneta working on a project outside of The Simpsons. The opening title sequence was created by Saul Bass and Elaine Makatura Bass.

In both the novel and the film, the married couple's family name is Rose, and the title is an allusion to the battles between the warring houses of York and Lancaster who were contending for the English throne during the late Middle Ages. In Germany, the film was such a huge success that its German title Der Rosenkrieg became synonymous with high-conflict divorce and is now regularly used in the media.

Plot
Lawyer Gavin d'Amato is in his office discussing a divorce case with a taciturn client. Noticing the man's determination to divorce his wife, Gavin decides to tell him the story of one of his previous clients, a personal friend of his.

Eighteen years earlier, Oliver Rose, a student at Harvard Law School, meets Barbara at an auction on Nantucket, where they bid on the same antique. Oliver chats Barbara up and they become friends. When she misses her ferry home, the two end up spending the night together. Eventually they marry, have two children and settle in Washington, DC. Over the years, the Roses grow richer, and Barbara purchases an old mansion whose owner has recently died. However, cracks seem to be forming in the family, such as the children being overweight due to Barbara spoiling them with treats. As Oliver becomes a successful partner in his law firm, Barbara, who was a doting and loving wife early in the marriage, grows restless and begins to dislike him immensely.

Oliver cannot understand what he has done to earn Barbara's contempt, oblivious to his controlling, self-centered and generally dismissive behavior toward her. When he believes he is suffering a heart attack the day after an argument, Barbara does not show any concern for his well-being, and ultimately admits that she no longer loves him and wants a divorce. Oliver accepts, but tension arises between the two during a meeting with Barbara's lawyer when Barbara makes it clear that she wants the house and everything in it, even using Oliver's final love note to her (which he had written in the hospital) as leverage against him in their legal battle. Oliver hires Gavin on a retainer as his legal counsel. 

Barbara initially throws Oliver out of the house, but he moves back in after discovering a legal loophole that allows him to stay while the outcome of the divorce is pending. As a result, Barbara immediately begins plotting to remove Oliver herself, even going as far as trying to seduce Gavin into siding with her instead. In an effort to compromise, Oliver offers his wife a considerable sum of cash in exchange for the house, but Barbara still refuses to settle. Realizing that his client is in a no-win situation, Gavin advises Oliver to end the conflict by leaving Barbara with the house and starting a new life for himself. Oliver responds by firing Gavin and decides to take matters into his own hands.

At this point, the couple begin spiting and humiliating each other in every way possible, even in front of friends and potential business clients. Both begin destroying their furnishings; the stove, furniture, Staffordshire ornaments, and dishware. In addition, Oliver accidentally runs over Barbara's cat in the driveway. When she finds out, she retaliates by trapping Oliver inside his private sauna, where he nearly succumbs to heatstroke and dehydration.

Oliver eventually calms down and attempts to make peace with Barbara over an elegant dinner, but finally reaches his breaking point when she serves him a paté which she implies was made from his dog (which turns out to be a bluff). He physically attacks Barbara, who flees into the attic. Oliver boards up the house to prevent Barbara from escaping, while Barbara loosens the chandelier to drop on Oliver. When their German housekeeper Susan pays them an unexpected visit during the night, she senses something is terribly wrong and discreetly contacts Gavin for help. 

By the time Gavin arrives, Oliver and Barbara's quarrel has culminated in the two hanging dangerously from the insecure chandelier. During this time, Oliver admits that despite their hardships, he always loved Barbara, but she does not respond. Before Gavin can come inside with a ladder, the chandelier's support cable fails, leaving only the electrical wiring to the fuse box supporting the couple and the chandelier. Despite Oliver's conviction that each wire can hold "at least two hundred pounds," the wire eventually fails as well, sending Oliver, Barbara, and the chandelier crashing violently to the floor. In his final breaths, Oliver reaches out to touch Barbara's shoulder, but Barbara uses her last ounce of strength to push his hand away, firmly asserting her hatred for him even in death.

Finishing his story, Gavin presents his client with two options: either proceed with the divorce and face a horrific bloodbath in court, or go home to his wife to settle their differences properly. The client chooses the latter, and Gavin, satisfied, calls his wife to tell her he loves her and is on his way home.

Cast
 Michael Douglas as Oliver Rose
 Kathleen Turner as Barbara Rose
 Danny DeVito as Gavin D'Amato
 Marianne Sägebrecht as Susan
 Dan Castellaneta as Gavin's client
 Sean Astin as 17-year-old Josh Rose
 Trenton Teigen as 10-year-old Josh Rose
 Heather Fairfield as 17-year-old Carolyn Rose
 G.D. Spradlin as Harry Thurmont
 Peter Donat as Jason Larrabee
 David Wohl as Dr. Gordon
 Shirley Mitchell as Mrs. Dewitt
 Peter Hansen as Mr. Marshall
 Roy Brocksmith as Mr. Fisk

Release
The premiere of The War of the Roses took place in Los Angeles on December 4 and in New York at the Gotham Theatre on December 6, 1989. It was released in the United States on December 8, 1989, by 20th Century Fox. The film was preceded in theaters by "Family Therapy", a The Simpsons short from The Tracey Ullman Show which was also included on the film's UK and Australian VHS rental releases.

Home media
The War of the Roses was released in the U.S. on DVD Special Edition on December 18, 2001. Released by 20th Century Fox, the film is presented in its original 1.85:1 widescreen format; and features director commentary with Danny DeVito, deleted scenes, computer sketches, storyboards, still galleries, 4 theatrical trailers, and 6 TV advertisements. A Blu-ray Filmmakers ‘Signature Series’ released on September 18, 2012 ports over old bonus features and adds new featurette interviews in HD about revisiting the film and its musical score. A Blu-ray was released by Fox in the United Kingdom in January 2013 with the same extra features.

Reception

Box office
Upon its release, The War of the Roses grossed $87 million in the United States and Canada, and $73 million in other territories, for a worldwide total of $160 million.

During the film's weekend debut it grossed $9.5 million across 1,259 theaters, finishing number-one at the box office the week ending December 10. The film grossed $6.9 million in its second weekend, representing a drop of just 26.5% and finishing second, and then made $5.5 million on the third. On its fourth weekend the film climbed up to first place again grossing $10,490,781 across 1,526	theaters on New Years long weekend. In its fifth weekend the film made $7 million, bringing its running domestic total to $53.4 million. In its twelfth weekend, its domestic total earnings reached $80.5 million. It was the thirteenth highest-grossing film of 1989.

Critical response
On Rotten Tomatoes the film has an 85% rating based on 40 reviews, with an average rating of 7.08/10. The site's critical consensus reads: "The War of the Roses is a black comedy made even funnier by hanging onto its caustic convictions -- and further distinguished by Danny DeVito's stylish direction." On Metacritic the film has a score of 79% based on reviews from 17 critics, indicating "generally favorable reviews". Audiences polled by CinemaScore gave the film an average grade of "B" on an A+ to F scale.

The Chicago Sun Times film critic Roger Ebert gave it three out of four stars, writing "The War of the Roses is a black, angry, bitter, unrelenting comedy, a war between the sexes that makes James Thurber's work on the same subject look almost resigned by comparison. And yet the Roses fell so naturally and easily into love, in those first sunny days so long ago." He concluded "This is an odd, strange movie and the only one I can remember in which the moral is, "Rather than see a divorce lawyer, be generous - generous to the point of night sweats." 
Sheila Benson of the Los Angeles Times called it "Biting and vicious, a styptic pencil on the battered face of "civilized divorce." It's also thoughtful, laceratingly funny, and bravely true to its own black-and-blue comic vision."
Peter Travers of Rolling Stone wrote: "Under the astute direction of Danny DeVito, who does a sly turn as Oliver's attorney, this acid-dipped epic of revenge is killingly funny and dramatically daring."

Accolades

References

External links
 
 

1989 films
1980s black comedy films
American black comedy films
1980s English-language films
Films directed by Danny DeVito
Films produced by James L. Brooks
Films based on American novels
Films set in Philadelphia
Gracie Films films
20th Century Fox films
Films about divorce
Films scored by David Newman
1989 comedy films
Films produced by Arnon Milchan
1980s American films